Absurd Pop Song Romance is the fourth studio album, sixth album overall, by American queercore band Pansy Division, released on September 8, 1998 by Lookout! Records.

Absurd Pop Song Romance saw a major stylistic shift from the punk rock and pop punk sounds of Pansy Division's first three albums, featuring more textured indie rock and alternative rock. This was the first Pansy Division album to feature four members following the addition of lead guitarist Patrick Goodwin.

Critical reception was generally positive. AllMusic gave the album a modest rating of 3 out of 5 stars, praising the maturity of the songwriting and Jon Ginoli's "earnest and humorous" lyricism, summarizing the album as "fun, honest, catchy, and energetic".

Track listing

Personnel
Pansy Division
Jon Ginoli – vocals, guitar
Chris Freeman – vocals, bass, keyboards on tracks 6, 7 and 13, drums on track 8 
Patrick Goodwin – lead guitar
Luis Illades – drums, bass on track 8

Additional musicians
Miriam Sturm – violin on track 16
Edgar Gabriel – violin on track 16
Bill Kronenberg – viola on track 16
Sara Wollan – cello on track 16
Kirk Garrison – trumpet on track 11
Bob Frankich – saxophone on track 11

Production
Recorded and mixed by Steve Albini

References

1998 albums
Pansy Division albums
albums produced by Steve Albini
Lookout! Records albums